Lajos Gráf (28 May 1893 – 11 February 1949) was a Hungarian rower. He competed in the men's eight event at the 1912 Summer Olympics. Gráf committed suicide by hanging himself in 1949.

References

External links
 

1893 births
1949 suicides
Hungarian male rowers
Olympic rowers of Hungary
Rowers at the 1912 Summer Olympics
Rowers from Budapest
Suicides by hanging in Hungary